Bretland is a surname. Notable people with the surname include:

 Barrie Bretland (1928–1998), Australian rules footballer
 John Bretland Farmer (1865–1944), British botanist
 Joseph Bretland (1742–1819), English minister

See also
 Breeland